The University of Sydney Union (USU), established in 1874, is the student-run services and amenities provider at the University of Sydney in Sydney, Australia. The USU's key services include the provision of food and beverages, retail outlets, live music and other entertainment, clubs & societies, festivals and events including the biggest Orientation Week (OWeek) in Australia.

The University of Sydney Union provides student services and amenities and supports the university's strong debating, dramatic, and cultural traditions, through over 200 clubs and societies.

USU also boasts some of the oldest political clubs in the country. The Sydney University Labor Club is the oldest political campus club in Australia.

History 
The Sydney University Union (SUU) was established in 1874 for debating, at a time when the university had fewer than a hundred students; graduates and staff were thus dominant. In 1884, the university's Senate provided a common room for the union, and in 1906, it decided to provide a building for the union's use. This building is now known as the Holme Building. Holme contains a large Refectory, historically a dining hall and now a function space. The interior is decorated with three murals by the artist Virgil Lo Schiavo: the Sulman-Prize-winning Tribute to Shakespeare (1945), the Sulman-Prize finalist Characters from Dickens (1951), and in the main hall, Mankind (1970).

A separate Sydney University Women's Union (SUWU) was formed in 1914. The Senate also agreed to fund a building for the Women's Union; Manning House was opened in 1917. It was at this time that the university made membership of one of the two Unions compulsory.

Until the 1970s, the Unions' headquarters were an important meeting place for staff and students; however, with the establishment of a University of Sydney staff club and the growth in size of the university population, the influence of staff in the activities of the Student Union decreased. The amalgamation of the two student unions came after the decision in 1971 to jointly fund the construction of the Wentworth Building, named after William Wentworth, one of the leading figures in the colony of New South Wales. The two unions amalgamated on 1 January 1972 to form the University of Sydney Union (USU).

The USU today 

The USU operates numerous programs, from facilities located in three main buildings, Manning House, and the Wentworth and the Holme Building. These buildings house the large proportion of the university's catering outlets, and provide space for retail outlets, an art gallery, meeting rooms, game rooms, bars, cafes, restaurants and function centres. One of the more prominent activities organised by the union is the Orientation Week (or "OWeek") festival, centering on stalls set up by clubs and societies along Eastern Avenue, the main university thoroughfare, and events and entertainment at the beginning of the semester each year to welcome new students to university. The clubs and societies programme is a key part of the union's activities, with over two hundred clubs to cater for the university's diverse student population.

Manning Bar, on the top floor of Manning House, has been a major part of Sydney's live music scene. It hosts the Sydney Uni Band Comp, launching the careers of The Jezabels, The Laurels, and Cloud Control. In February 2020 it was announced that Manning Bar would no longer trade during daytime hours, but would remain active as a music venue.

The union also has an extensive art collection, and until 2006, it maintained the Sir Hermann Black Gallery.  In July 2009, the Verge Gallery opened in the Jane Foss Russell Plaza as a new student art space on main campus.

The USU award-winning startup accelerator and entrepreneur program, INCUBATE fosters a proactive community of entrepreneurs on campus.

Today, the union is operated as a business, with a board of directors elected by the students at the university. Consisting of 14 members, the board is composed of:
 11 directors elected for overlapping two year terms by members of the union, with 5 elected in even-numbered years and 6 elected in odd-numbered years;
 2 directors appointed by the University of Sydney Senate; and
 The immediate past president, who is non-voting.

Debating 

The USU team were the 2007 World Debating Champions and 2008 Australasian Debating Champions, and in recent years have dominated the finals of the Australian and Australasian Championships, with William Price, Charlie Ryan and Sam Trotter winning the 2022 Australasian Championships. In 2014, the Mandarin debates team won the Fourth Australian Mandarin Debating Championship, and placed second in the prestigious International Chinese Debating Competition in Beijing. USU team captain, Charles Yuchen Zhang, was also awarded the top prize in the individual competition.

Also in 2014, the USU debaters placed second in the Worlds Universities Debating Championships (WUDC). Eleanor Jones (USU B team) was awarded World's Best Speaker.  Former debaters include the former prime minister John Howard and Justice Michael Kirby.

Student media 

There are a number of publications on campus supported by the USU.  The University of Sydney Union's literary magazine Hermes was first published in 1886 and is the oldest journal in Australia. Distinguished former editors have included Thomas Bavin (1874), H. V. Evatt, John Le Gay Brereton, James McAuley (1937), Jock Marshall (1941), and a duo of Les Murray and Geoffrey Lehmann in 1962.

Arna is also an annual literary journal published by the University of Sydney Arts Student Society. First published in 1918, it was disbanded in 1974. It was relaunched as Arna in 2008 by Rebecca Santos and Khym Scott, alongside the revival of the Sydney Arts Students' Society. The journal contains creatives pieces as written and edited by students.

Student publication the Union Recorder was first published in 1921, showcasing writing from University of Sydney students. The Bull, formerly The Bulletin, was a daily print outlining the events of the day on campus, which had been since rebranded BULL Magazine, which is edited and written by students. In recent years, the Recorder became a monthly publication; however, due to rationalisation in the face of VSU, it was announced in the November 2005 issue that it would become an annual publication , with BULL Magazine taking its place as the primary repository of student content to be published monthly. In 2015, it was announced that BULL Magazine will be re-launched as an online only site for student created news and content.

Since its creation at the start of 2016, PULP Media, successor to BULL Magazine has boasted a number of successful breaking news pieces, such as editor Aparna Balakumar's "Rackweb".

Presidents & Office Bearers 

Notable past Presidents & Office Bearers of the University of Sydney Union include:
 Edmund Barton (1884–1885), Australian politician and judge, was the first prime minister of Australia and a founding justice of the High Court of Australia.
 H.V. Evatt (1916–1917), Australian jurist, politician and writer.
 Michael Kirby (1964–1965), former justice of the High Court of Australia.
 Adam Spencer – Australian radio presenter.

See also 
 University of Sydney Students' Representative Council

References

Citations

Sources 

 USU 2004 Annual Report Summary
 Williams, Bruce. Liberal education and useful knowledge: a brief history of the University of Sydney, 1850-2000, Chancellor's Committee, University of Sydney, 2002. .
 Wilkie, Janet. "Amalgamated, But The Same: a brief history of the first 25 years of the University of Sydney Union 1972-1996", The University of Sydney Union, 1996.

External links 
 University of Sydney Union website
 Manning Bar
 Hermann's Bar
 Verge Arts Festival
 Access Benefits Program
 Sydney University Radio Group

University of Sydney
Students' unions in Australia